Chutak (also knows as Chhutuk) is a village in the Kargil district of Ladakh, India.

See also 
 Chutak Hydroelectric Plant

References 

Villages in Kargil tehsil